South Fork Estates is a census-designated place (CDP) in Jim Hogg County, Texas, United States. The population was 70 at the 2010 census, up from 47 at the 2000 census.

Geography
South Fork Estates is located in northern Jim Hogg County at  (27.267222, -98.725038). Texas State Highway 16 runs along the eastern edge of the community, leading north  to Hebbronville, the county seat, and southwest  to Randado.

Demographics
As of the census of 2000, there were 47 people, 15 households, and 10 families residing in the CDP. The population density was 14.0 people per square mile (5.4/km2). There were 21 housing units at an average density of 6.2/sq mi (2.4/km2). The racial makeup of the CDP was 72.34% White, 2.13% Native American, 25.53% from other races. Hispanic or Latino of any race were 76.60% of the population.

There were 15 households, out of which 46.7% had children under the age of 18 living with them, 60.0% were married couples living together, 6.7% had a female householder with no husband present, and 33.3% were non-families. 26.7% of all households were made up of individuals, and 6.7% had someone living alone who was 65 years of age or older. The average household size was 3.13 and the average family size was 4.10.

In the CDP, the population was spread out, with 42.6% under the age of 18, 4.3% from 18 to 24, 29.8% from 25 to 44, 19.1% from 45 to 64, and 4.3% who were 65 years of age or older. The median age was 34 years. For every 100 females, there were 74.1 males. For every 100 females age 18 and over, there were 92.9 males.

The median income for a household in the CDP was $60,139, and the median income for a family was $60,139. Males had a median income of $0 versus $0 for females. The per capita income for the CDP was $14,429. None of the population or families were below the poverty line.

Education
South Fork Estates, as with all of Jim Hogg County, is served by the Jim Hogg County Independent School District.

The district has three schools: Hebbronville Elementary School, Hebbronville Junior High School, and Hebbronville High School. All of the schools are considered to be in the Hebbronville community.

References

Census-designated places in Texas
Census-designated places in Jim Hogg County, Texas